Michael William Misuraca (born August 21, 1968 in Long Beach, California) is a retired Major League Baseball pitcher. He played during one season at the major league level for the Milwaukee Brewers. He was signed by the Minnesota Twins as an amateur free agent in 1988. Misuraca played his first professional season with their Rookie League Elizabethton Twins and Class A Kenosha Twins in 1989, and his last with the Brewers' Triple-A Tucson Toros in 1997.

References
, or Retrosheet, or Pura Pelota (Venezuelan Winter League)

1968 births
Living people
Baseball players from Long Beach, California
Cincinnati Reds scouts
Elizabethton Twins players
Fort Myers Miracle players
Kenosha Twins players
Major League Baseball pitchers
Milwaukee Brewers players
Nashville Xpress players
New Orleans Zephyrs players
Pastora de Occidente players
Salt Lake Buzz players
Tucson Toros players
Visalia Oaks players
American expatriate baseball players in Venezuela